Rossana Campo (born 17 October 1963 in Genoa, Italy) is an Italian writer and painter. She is of Neapolitan descent.

Bibliography 
 In principio erano le mutande, ("In the beginning were the pants"), Feltrinelli, Milan, 1992.
 Il pieno di super ("Premium gasoline full tank"), Feltrinelli, Milan, 1993.
 Mai sentita così bene ("Never felt so good"), Feltrinelli, Milan, 1995.
 L'Attore americano, ("The American actor"), Feltrinelli, Milan, 1997.
 Il Matrimonio di Maria, ("Maria's wedding"), Feltrinelli, Milan, 1998.
 Mentre la mia bella dorme ("While my beauty sleeps"), Feltrinelli, Milan, 1999.
 Sono pazza di te ("Mad about you"), Feltrinelli, Milan, 2001.
 L'Uomo che non ho sposato ("The man I didn't marry"), Feltrinelli, Milan, 2003.
 Duro come l'amore ("Hard as love"), Feltrinelli, Milan, 2005.
 Più forte di me ("Can't help it"), Feltrinelli, Milan, 2007.
 Lezioni di arabo ("Arabic lessons"), Feltrinelli, Milan, 2010.
 Felice per quello che sei. Confessioni di una buddista emotiva, Giulio Perrone editore, Rome, 2012.
 Il posto delle donne ("The place of women"), Ponte alle Grazie, Florence, 2013.
 Piccoli Budda, Gallucci, Rome, 2013
 Fare l'amore ("Making love"), Ponte alle Grazie, Florence, 2014.

References

External links 

Feltrinelli catalog
Author info on ponteallegrazie.it
Author info on galluccieditore.com

Italian women writers
1963 births
Living people
University of Genoa alumni
Writers from Genoa
People of Campanian descent